Baranlu (also Romanized as Bārānlū; also known as Bārā'lū) is a village in Tazeh Kand Rural District, Khosrowshahr District, Tabriz County, East Azerbaijan Province, Iran. At the 2006 census, its population was 1,169, in 299 families.

References 

Populated places in Tabriz County